Woodside is a historic plantation house located near Milton, Caswell County, North Carolina. It was built about 1838, and is Greek Revival style dwelling consisting of a two-story, center-hall plan single-pile main block with a two-story, double-pile rear ell.  It has a low hipped roof and features a pedimented portico supported by four unfluted Doric order columns.  Also on the property is a contributing smokehouse.

It was added to the National Register of Historic Places in 1986.

References

External links
The Woodside House

Plantation houses in North Carolina
Houses on the National Register of Historic Places in North Carolina
Greek Revival houses in North Carolina
Houses completed in 1838
Houses in Caswell County, North Carolina
National Register of Historic Places in Caswell County, North Carolina